Tabanus maculicornis also known as the narrow-winged horsefly is a species of biting horse-fly.

Distribution
This species can be found in most of Europe, in the East Palearctic realm (Russia) and in the Near East (Transcaucasus). It mainly lives in wooded areas with streams or in marshy grassland.

Description
These quite small horseflies have a dark body. The abdomen of the females shows three rows of whitish or greyish triangles, with oblique sublateral markings on tergites 2 and 3. The head has a grey supraoccipital border. Females have scissor-like mouthparts that aim to cut the skin and then lap up the blood. The alula is narrower than in Tabanus bromius (hence the species common name). The eyes are green, but in males they show a broad purple band, while in females they have a coppery sheen and a single purple band.

Biology
Adults fly flies from mid-May to mid-July, with a peak in late June. The females of this species are blood-sucking from grazing cattle (mainly cows and horses), but they mainly feed on nectar. They may also feed on human blood. Males only feed on nectar. Larvae live in boggy soil and in moss.

Bibliography
 Kniepert, F.W. (1980). Blood-feeding and nectar-feeding in adult Tabanidae (Diptera). Oecologia 46, 125-129.
 Krčmar, S. & Leclercq, M. (1999). Horse flies (Tabanidae) a contribution to the knowledge about the biodiversity of Lonjsko Polje/. Bulletin S.R.B.E./K.B.V.E. 135, 209-213.
 Krčmar S. et al. (2005). Response of Tabanidae (Diptera) to natural and synthetic olfactory attractants. Journal of Vector Ecology 30(1), 133-136.
 Krčmar, S. & Maríc (2006). Analysis of the feeding sites for some horse flies (Diptera, Tabanidae) on a human in Croatia. Collegium Antropologicum. 30 (4), 901-904.
 Krčmar, S. (2007). Response of Tabanidae (Diptera) to canopy traps baited with 4-methylphenol, 3-isopropylphenol, and napthalene. Journal of Vector Ecology 31(2), 188-192.
 Oldroyd, H. (1939). Brachycera. In: F.W. Edwards et al. British blood-sucking flies. British Museum (Nat. Hist.), London.

References

Tabanidae
Diptera of Europe
Insects described in 1842
Articles containing video clips
Taxa named by Johan Wilhelm Zetterstedt